This list of the prehistoric life of Wyoming contains the various prehistoric life-forms whose fossilized remains have been reported from within the US state of Wyoming.

Precambrian
The Paleobiology Database records no known occurrences of Precambrian fossils in Alabama.

Paleozoic

Selected Paleozoic taxa of Wyoming
 †Actinoceras
 †Agassizodus
 †Agassizodus variabilis
 †Agnostogonus
 †Amphiscapha
 †Amplexus
 †Anarthraspis chamberlini
 †Archaeocidaris
  †Astraspis
 †Astraspis desiderata
 †Aviculopecten
 †Aviculopecten basilicus – or unidentified comparable form
 †Aviculopecten girtyi
 †Aviculopecten gryphus
 †Aviculopecten kaibabensis – or unidentified comparable form
 †Bellerophon
 †Blountiella
 †Bowmania
 †Bucheria – type locality for genus
  †Burnetia
  †Campodus
 †Caninia
 †Cardipeltis
 †Cardipeltis wallacii
 †Catenipora
 †Cavusgnathus
 †Cedaria
 †Cephalaspis
 †Charactoceras – tentative report
 †Chirognathus
 †Chonetes
  †Cleiothyridina
 †Cleiothyridina atrypoides
 †Cleiothyridina elegans – or unidentified related form
 †Cleiothyridina hirsuta
 †Cleiothyridina sublamellosa – or unidentified related form
 †Coleodus
  †Composita
 †Composita elongata
 †Composita laevis – or unidentified related form
 †Composita mira
 †Composita ovata
 †Composita sigma
 †Composita subquadrata
 †Composita subtilita
 †Composita sulcata
 †Conocardium
 †Coosella
 †Coosia
 †Coosina
 †Cordylodus
 †Crepicephalus
 †Ctenacanthus
 †Ctenacanthus amblyxiphias
 †Cyrtogomphoceras
 †Deckera
  †Dentalium
 †Distichophytum
 †Drepanophycus
 †Earlandia
 †Edmondia
  †Endoceras
 †Euomphalus
 †Favosites
 †Gastrioceras – report made of unidentified related form or using admittedly obsolete nomenclature
 †Genevievella
 †Geragnostus
 †Girvanella
  †Glikmanius
 †Glikmanius occidentalis
 †Glyptopleura
 †Goniatites – tentative report
 †Gosslingia
  †Helicoprion
 †Helicoprion davisii
 †Homagnostus
 †Hyolithes
 †Hypseloconus
 †Idiognathoides
 †Ithyektyphus
  †Janassa
 †Kendallina
 †Kingstonia
 †Kionoceras
 †Kochoceras
 †Lambeoceras
 † Leclercqia
 †Lingula
 †Lingulella
 †Liroceras
 †Lonchocephalus
 †Maryvillia
 †Metacoceras
  †Meteoraspis
 †Micromitra
 †Minicephalus – type locality for genus
 †Naticopsis
 †Naticopsis judithae
 †Naticopsis kaibabensis
 †Naticopsis marthaae – or unidentified comparable form
 †Neospirifer
 †Neospirifer bakeri
 Nucula – tentative report
 †Olenoides
 †Ozarkodina
 †Paladin
 †Paractinoceras
 †Peripetoceras
  †Plaesiomys
 †Platyceras
 †Platystrophia
 †Posidonia
 †Prodentalium
 †Protaspis
 †Pseudomelania – tentative report
 †Psilophyton
 †Rawlinsella
  †Renalia
 †Sallya
  †Saukiella
 †Sawdonia
 Solemya
 †Solenochilus
 †Spiriferina
 †Spyroceras
 †Stearoceras
 †Streptognathodus
 †Strophomena
 †Syspacheilus
 †Tainoceras
 †Tetrataxis
  †Tricrepicephalus
 †Uncaspis
 †Uranolophus
 †Westonoceras
 †Wilkingia
 †Winnipegoceras
 †Worthenia
 †Zellerina

Mesozoic

Selected Mesozoic taxa of Wyoming
  Acipenser
 †Adocus
 †Agathaumas – type locality for genus
 †Agathaumas sylvestris – type locality for species
 †Agerostrea
  †Albanerpeton
 †Albanerpeton galaktion
 †Albanerpeton nexuosus – type locality for species
 †Albertosaurus – or unidentified comparable form
 †Allognathosuchus
   †Allosaurus – type locality for genus
 †Allosaurus fragilis – type locality for species
  †Alphadon
 †Alphadon attaragos – type locality for species
 †Alphadon halleyi
 †Alphadon marshi
 †Alphadon sahnii
 †Amblotherium – type locality for genus
 Amia
 †Amphicoelias
 †Amphicoelias brontodiplodocus – type locality for species
 †Amphidon – type locality for genus
 †Amphidon superstes – type locality for species
 †Anaklinoceras
 †Anaschisma – type locality for genus
 †Ancorichnus
 †Andromeda
 †Anemia
   †Angistorhinus – type locality for genus
 †Angistorhinus aeolamnis – type locality for species
 †Angistorhinus gracilis – type locality for species
 †Angistorhinus grandis – type locality for species
 †Angistorhinus maximus – type locality for species
 †Anisoceras
  †Ankylosaurus
 †Ankylosaurus magniventris
 Anomia
 Anona
 Antrimpos
 †Apatosaurinae
  †Apatosaurus
 †Apatosaurus louisae
 †Apatosaurus minimus
 †Aploconodon – type locality for genus
 †Aploconodon comoensis – type locality for species
 Aporrhais
 †Aquilina – type locality for genus
 Aralia
  Araucaria
 Arca – report made of unidentified related form or using admittedly obsolete nomenclature
 †Archaeotrigon – type locality for genus
  †Arcticoceras
 †Arenicolites
 Aspideretes
 †Asplenium
 †Astarta
 Astarte
 † Atira – tentative report
 †Atokatheridium – or unidentified comparable form
  †Aublysodon
 †Aublysodon mirandus
  †Baculites
 †Baculites asper
 †Baculites asperiformis
 †Baculites baculus
 †Baculites clinolobatus
 †Baculites cobbani
 †Baculites codyensis
 †Baculites crickmayi
 †Baculites elaisi
 †Baculites eliasi
 †Baculites gilberti
 †Baculites grandis
 †Baculites gregoryensis
 †Baculites haresi
 †Baculites jenseni – or unidentified comparable form
 †Baculites mariasensis
 †Baculites mclearni
 †Baculites obtusus
 †Baculites perplexus
 †Baculites reesidei
 †Baculites rugosus
 †Baculites scotti
 †Baena
 †Baptanodon
 Barbatia – tentative report
  †Barosaurus
 †Barosaurus lentus
 †Basilemys
 †Belonostomus
 †Belonostomus longirostris
 Bombur
 †Borealosuchus
 †Borealosuchus sternbergii – type locality for species
 Botula
 †Botula ripleyana
 Brachaelurus
  †Brachiosaurus
 †Brachybrachium – type locality for genus
 †Brachybrachium brevipes – type locality for species
  †Brachychampsa
 †Brachychampsa montana
 †Brachyphyllum
 †Brontopodus – or unidentified comparable form
  †Brontosaurus – type locality for genus
 †Brontosaurus excelsus – type locality for species
 †Brontosaurus parvus – type locality for species
 †Brontosaurus yahnahpin – type locality for species
 †Bryceomys
 †Cadoceras
 Callista
 †Calycoceras
  †Camarasaurus – type locality for genus
 †Camarasaurus grandis – type locality for species
 †Camarasaurus lentus – type locality for species
 Campeloma
  †Camptosaurus
 †Camptosaurus dispar – type locality for species
 † Canna
 †Cedrobaena
 †Celastrus – tentative report
 †Ceramornis – type locality for genus
 †Ceramornis major – type locality for species
 †Ceratodus
  †Ceratosaurus
 Cercidiphyllum
 Cerithium – tentative report
 †Chamops – type locality for genus
  †Champsosaurus
 †Chelonipus – or unidentified comparable form
 Chiloscyllium
  †Chirotherium
 †Chirotherium barthii
 Chlamys
 †Chondroceras
 †Cimexomys
 †Cimexomys minor
 †Cimolestes
 †Cimolestes incisus – type locality for species
 †Cimolestes stirtoni – type locality for species
 †Cimolodon
 †Cimolodon nitidus – type locality for species
  †Cimolomys
 †Cimolomys clarki
 †Cimolomys gracilis – type locality for species
 †Cimolomys parvus – type locality for species
 †Cimolopteryx
 †Cimolopteryx maxima – type locality for species
 †Cimolopteryx rara
 Cinnamomum
 Cissus
  Cladophlebis
 †Cladophlebis parva
 †Cladophlebis readi – type locality for species
 †Cladophlebis wyomingensis – type locality for species
 †Claraia
 †Claraia clarai
 †Claraia mulleri
 †Claraia stachei
 †Clemensodon – type locality for genus
 †Clemensodon megaloba – type locality for species
 †Coelosuchus – type locality for genus
  †Coelurus – type locality for genus
 †Coelurus fragilis – type locality for species
  †Collignoniceras
 †Collignoniceras woollgari
 †Comobatrachus – type locality for genus
 †Comodactylus – type locality for genus
 †Comodactylus ostromi – type locality for species
 †Comodon – type locality for genus
 †Comodon gidleyi – type locality for species
 †Comonecturoides – type locality for genus
 †Comotherium – type locality for genus
 †Compsemys
  †Coniophis – type locality for genus
 †Corax
 Corbula
 †Coriops
 †Corosaurus
 †Corosaurus alcovensis
 Crenella
 †Cretorectolobus
 †Cretorectolobus olsoni
 †Ctenacodon – type locality for genus
 †Ctenacodon laticeps – type locality for species
 †Ctenacodon scindens – type locality for species
 †Ctenacodon serratus – type locality for species
 †Cteniogenys – type locality for genus
  Cucullaea
 †Cunningtoniceras
 Cuspidaria
 †Dakotasaurus – type locality for genus
  †Daspletosaurus
  †Deinonychus
 †Deinonychus antirrhopus
 †Deltatheroides – or unidentified comparable form
 †Dennstaedtia
 Dentalium
 †Dentalium pauperculum
 †Derrisemys
  †Desmatosuchus
 †Dicotyledon
  †Didelphodon
 †Didymoceras
 †Didymoceras nebrascense
 †Didymoceras stevensoni
 †Dinochelys
 †Diospyros
 †Diplocraterion
 †Diplodocinae
  †Diplodocus
 †Diplodocus carnegii – type locality for species
 †Diplodocus hallorum
 †Diplodocus longus
  †Discoscaphites
 †Docodon – type locality for genus
 †Docodon affinis – type locality for species
 †Docodon crassus – type locality for species
 †Docodon striatus – type locality for species
 †Docodon superus – type locality for species
 †Docodon victor – type locality for species
 †Dolichobrachium – type locality for genus
  †Dolichorhynchops
 †Dolichorhynchops bonneri – type locality for species
 †Dolichorhynchops osborni
 †Doratodon – tentative report
 †Dorsetisaurus
 †Drinker – type locality for genus
 †Drinker nisti – type locality for species
 †Dromaeosaurus
 †Dryolestes – type locality for genus
 Dryopteris
 †Dryosaurus
 †Dryosaurus altus – type locality for species
 †Dryptosaurus – or unidentified comparable form
 †Dyslocosaurus – type locality for genus
 †Dyslocosaurus polyonychius – type locality for species
 †Echidnocephalus – tentative report
  †Edmontonia
 †Edmontonia rugosidens – or unidentified comparable form
 †Edmontosaurus
  †Edmontosaurus annectens – type locality for species
 †Elaphrosaurus – tentative report
  †Elasmosaurus
 †Emarginachelys
 †Empo
 †Enneabatrachus – type locality for genus
 †Enneabatrachus hechti – type locality for species
 †Eobatrachus – type locality for genus
 †Eocephalites
 †Eopelobates
 †Equisetum
 †Essonodon
 †Essonodon browni
  †Eubostrychoceras
 †Eubrachiosaurus – type locality for genus
 †Eubrachiosaurus browni – type locality for species
 †Eucalycoceras
 †Eucrossorhinus
 †Euomphaloceras
 †Euspira
 †Euthlastus – type locality for genus
  †Eutrephoceras
 †Eutretauranosuchus
 †Eutretauranosuchus delfsi
 †Exiteloceras
 †Exogyra
 †Exogyra costata
 Fasciolaria
 Ficus
 †Forresteria
  †Fosterovenator – type locality for genus
 †Foxraptor – type locality for genus
 †Fraxinus
 †Galeamopus
 †Galeamopus hayi
 †Galeamopus pabsti – type locality for species
  †Gargoyleosaurus
 †Gargoyleosaurus parkpinorum
 Gerrhonotus – or unidentified comparable form
 †Gervillaria
 †Gervillia
 †Gilmoremys
 †Gilmoremys lancensis – type locality for species
 Ginglymostoma
  Ginkgo
 †Ginkgo adiantoides – tentative report
 †Glyptops – type locality for genus
 Glyptostrobus
  †Gobiconodon
 †Goniopholis
 †Gryphaea
 †Habrosaurus – type locality for genus
 †Habrosaurus dilatus – type locality for species
 †Hamites
  †Haplocanthosaurus
 †Harpactognathus – type locality for genus
 †Harpactognathus gentryii – type locality for species
 †Heptasuchus – type locality for genus
 †Heptasuchus clarki – type locality for species
  †Hesperosaurus – type locality for genus
 †Hesperosaurus mjosi – type locality for species
 †Heteroceras
  †Hoploscaphites
 †Hoploscaphites birkelundae – type locality for species
 †Hoploscaphites gilli
 †Hoploscaphites nodosus
 †Hoploscaphites plenus
 †Hoploscaphites quadrangularis
  †Hybodus
 †Hybodus montanensis
 †Hybodus wyomingensis – type locality for species
  †Hyperodapedon
 †Hyperodapedon sanjuanensis – or unidentified comparable form
  †Ichthyodectes
  †Inoceramus
 †Inoceramus agdjakendensis – or unidentified comparable form
 †Inoceramus americanus – type locality for species
 †Inoceramus anglicus
 †Inoceramus balchii
 †Inoceramus barabini
 †Inoceramus crispii
 †Inoceramus deformis
 †Inoceramus dimidius
 †Inoceramus erectus – or unidentified related form
 †Inoceramus fibrosus
 †Inoceramus fragilis – or unidentified related form
 †Inoceramus gibbosus
 †Inoceramus glacierensis
 †Inoceramus grandis
 †Inoceramus incurvus
 †Inoceramus lundbreckensis
 †Inoceramus perplexus
 †Inoceramus prefragilis
 †Inoceramus proximus – or unidentified related form
 †Inoceramus sagensis
 †Inoceramus subcircularis
 †Inoceramus subcompressus
 †Inoceramus sublaevis
 †Inoceramus tenuirostratus
 †Inoceramus tenuiumbonatus – or unidentified comparable form
 †Inoceramus turgidus – or unidentified related form
 †Inoceramus typicus
 †Inoceramus umbonatus
 †Inoceramus undabundus
 †Ischyrhiza
 †Ischyrhiza avonicola – type locality for species
 †Ischyrhiza basinensis – type locality for species
 †Ischyrhiza mira
 Isognomon
  Isurus – tentative report
 †Janumys
  †Jeletzkytes
 †Jeletzkytes dorfi – type locality for species
 †Kaatedocus – type locality for genus
 †Kaatedocus siberi – type locality for species
  †Koskinonodon – type locality for genus
 †Laolestes – type locality for genus
 †Laolestes eminens – type locality for species
 †Laolestes goodrichi – type locality for species
 †Laolestes oweni – type locality for species
 †Laopteryx – type locality for genus
 †Laosaurus – type locality for genus
 †Laosaurus celer – type locality for species
 Laurus
  †Lepidotes – or unidentified related form
 Lepisosteus
 †Leptalestes
 †Leptalestes cooki – type locality for species
 †Leptalestes krejcii
  †Leptoceratops
 †Leptoceratops gracilis
 Lima
 Lingula
 Liquidambar
 †Lisserpeton
 †Lisserpeton bairdi
 †Lissodus
 †Lonchidion – type locality for genus
 †Lonchodytes – type locality for genus
 †Lonchodytes estesi – type locality for species
 Lucina
 Lunatia – tentative report
 Lygodium
 †Macelognathus – type locality for genus
 Mactra
 †Mecochirus
  †Megalneusaurus
 †Megalneusaurus rex – type locality for species
 †Megasphaeroceras
 †Melvius
  †Meniscoessus
 †Meniscoessus intermedius
 †Meniscoessus robustus – type locality for species
 †Meniscoessus seminoensis – type locality for species
  †Menuites
 †Mesodma
 †Mesodma formosa
 †Mesodma hensleighi
 †Mesodma primaeva
 †Mesodma thompsoni – type locality for species
 †Metoicoceras
 †Metoicoceras geslinianum
 †Metoicoceras mosbyense – or unidentified comparable form
  †Microvenator
 †Microvenator celer
 Modiolus
 †Morosaurus
 †Myledaphus
 †Myledaphus bipartitus
 †Myophorella
 †Myophorella yellowstonensis
 Myrica
 †Mytilus
 †Nanocuris
  †Nanosaurus
 †Nanosaurus rex
 †Nanotyrannus – tentative report
 †Naomichelys
  †Nelumbo
 †Neocardioceras
 †Neocardioceras laevigatum – type locality for species
 †Neocardioceras minutum – type locality for species
 †Neocardioceras transiens
 †Neocardioceras uptonense – type locality for species
 †Neoplagiaulax
 †Nerinea – tentative report
  †Nodosaurus – type locality for genus
 †Nodosaurus textilis – type locality for species
 †Normannites – tentative report
 Nucula
 †Obamadon
 †Obamadon gracilis
 †Odaxosaurus – type locality for genus
 †Odaxosaurus piger – type locality for species
  Odontaspis
 †Oklatheridium
 †Onoclea
  †Ophiopsis
  †Ophthalmosaurus
 †Ophthalmosaurus natans
 †Opisthias
 †Opisthotriton
  †Ornitholestes – type locality for genus
 †Ornitholestes hermanni – type locality for species
 †Ornithomimus
 †Ornithomimus minutus
 †Ornithomimus sedens – type locality for species
 †Ornithomimus velox – or unidentified comparable form
 †Osmakasaurus – tentative report
 †Osmakasaurus depressus
 Ostrea
 †Othnielia
  †Othnielosaurus
 †Othnielosaurus consors – type locality for species
 †Oxytoma
  †Pachycephalosaurus
 †Pachycephalosaurus wyomingensis – type locality for species
 †Pachyrhizodus
 †Pachyteuthis
  †Palaeobatrachus
 †Palaeosaniwa – type locality for genus
 †Palaeosaniwa canadensis – type locality for species
 †Paleopsephurus
 †Paleopsephurus wilsoni
 †Paleorhinus
 †Paleorhinus parvus – type locality for species
 †Paliurus
 †Pantosaurus – type locality for genus
 †Pantosaurus striatus – type locality for species
 †Paracimexomys
 †Paracimexomys priscus
 †Paradiscoglossus – type locality for genus
 †Paralbula
 †Paramacellodus
  †Parasuchus
 †Paressonodon
 †Pariguana – type locality for genus
 †Parikimys
  †Paronychodon
 †Paronychodon lacustris – type locality for species
 †Paurodon – type locality for genus
 †Pecopteris
 Pecten
 †Pectinodon – type locality for genus
 †Pectinodon bakkeri – type locality for species
 Persea – report made of unidentified related form or using admittedly obsolete nomenclature
  †Phoenicites – or unidentified comparable form
 Pholadomya
 †Pholadomya inaequiplicata
 †Pholadomya kingi
 †Phragmites
 Phyllodus
 Physa – or unidentified comparable form
 †Piceoerpeton
 Pinna
 Pinus
 Pistacia
 †Pistia
  †Placenticeras
 †Placenticeras intercalare
 †Placenticeras meeki
 †Placenticeras pseudoplacenta
 †Plagiostoma
 Planorbis
 Platanus
  †Platecarpus
 †Platecarpus tympaniticus
 †Platymya
 †Platypterygius
 †Plesiobaena
  †Plesiopleurodon – type locality for genus
 †Plesiopleurodon wellesi – type locality for species
 †Plesiosaurus
 Plicatula
 Polinices
 †Polycotylus
  †Poposaurus – type locality for genus
 †Poposaurus gracilis – type locality for species
 Populus
 †Potamoceratodus
 †Potamornis – type locality for genus
 †Potamornis skutchi – type locality for species
 †Priacodon
 †Priacodon ferox – type locality for species
 †Priacodon grandaevus – type locality for species
 †Priacodon lulli – type locality for species
 †Priacodon robustus – type locality for species
 †Prodesmodon – type locality for genus
 †Prodiplocynodon – type locality for genus
 †Prodiplocynodon langi – type locality for species
 †Protocardia
  †Protungulatum – tentative report
 Prunus
 †Psalodon
 †Psalodon fortis – type locality for species
 †Psalodon marshi – type locality for species
 †Psalodon potens – type locality for species
 †Pseudoperna
 †Pseudoperna congesta
 †Pteraichnus
 †Pteraichnus stokesi – type locality for species
  †Pteranodon
 †Pteranodon longiceps
  †Pteria
 †Pterodactylus
 †Pterodactylus montanus – type locality for species
 †Ptilotodon
 †Ptychotrygon
 †Ptychotrygon boothi – type locality for species
 Quercus
 †Rhamnus
 Rhinobatos
 †Rhizocorallium
  †Richardoestesia
 †Richardoestesia isosceles
 Rostellaria – tentative report
 †Saccoloma – report made of unidentified related form or using admittedly obsolete nomenclature
 Salix
 †Salpichlaena
 Sassafras
 †Saurexallopus – type locality for genus
 †Saurocephalus
  †Saurolophus
  †Sauropelta
 †Sauropelta edwardsorum
  †Sauroposeidon
 †Sauroposeidon proteles
 †Saurornithoides – or unidentified comparable form
 †Saurornitholestes
 †Sauvagesia
 †Scapanorhynchus
 †Scapanorhynchus texanus
 †Scapherpeton
  †Scaphites
 †Scaphites aquilaensis
 †Scaphites binneyi
 †Scaphites hippocrepis
 †Scaphites stantoni
 †Scaphites ventricosus
 †Scaphites whitfieldi
 †Scotiophryne
 Scyliorhinus
  †Selaginella
 Sequoia
 †Skolithos
 †Smilax
 †Socognathus
 Solemya
 †Sparganium
 Sphaerium – or unidentified comparable form
  †Sphenodiscus
 †Sphenodiscus lobatus – or unidentified comparable form
 †Sphenodiscus pleurisepta
 †Sphenopteris
  Squalicorax
 †Squalicorax kaupi
 †Squalicorax pristodontus
 †Squatirhina
 †Squatirhina americana – type locality for species
 †Staphylea
 †Stegopelta – type locality for genus
 †Stegopelta landerensis – type locality for species
  †Stegosaurus – type locality for genus
 †Stegosaurus armatus – type locality for species
 †Stegosaurus longispinus – type locality for species
 †Stegosaurus stenops
 †Stegosaurus sulcatus – type locality for species
 †Stegosaurus ungulatus – type locality for species
 Sterculia
 †Stokesosaurus – tentative report
 †Stokesosaurus clevelandi
 †Struthiomimus – or unidentified comparable form
  †Styxosaurus
 †Styxosaurus browni – type locality for species
  †Supersaurus
 †Supersaurus vivianae
 †Tanycolagreus – type locality for genus
 †Tanycolagreus topwilsoni – type locality for species
 †Tatenectes
 †Tatenectes laramiensis – type locality for species
 †Tathiodon – type locality for genus
 †Tenea
  †Tenontosaurus
 †Tenontosaurus tilletti
 Teredo
 †Thalassinoides
 †Theatonius – type locality for genus
 †Theretairus – type locality for genus
  †Thescelosaurus – type locality for genus
 †Thescelosaurus neglectus – type locality for species
 †Thoracosaurus – or unidentified comparable form
 Thracia
 Thyasira
 †Thyrsopteris
 †Tinodon – type locality for genus
  †Torosaurus – type locality for genus
 †Torosaurus latus – type locality for species
 †Torotix – type locality for genus
 †Torotix clemensi – type locality for species
  †Torvosaurus – type locality for genus
 †Torvosaurus tanneri – type locality for species
 †Trachodon
 †Tragodesmoceras
 †Tragodesmoceras carlilense
 †Trapa
  †Triceratops – type locality for genus
 †Triceratops horridus – type locality for species
 †Triceratops ingens – type locality for species
 †Triceratops prorsus – type locality for species
 †Triceratops sulcatus – type locality for species
  †Trigonia
 †Trigonia americana
 †Trigonia elegantissima
 †Trigonia montanaensis
 †Trigonia quadrangularis
 †Trioracodon
 †Trioracodon bisulcus – type locality for species
  †Troodon
 †Troodon formosus
 Typha
  †Tyrannosaurus – type locality for genus
 †Tyrannosaurus rex – type locality for species
 †Uluops – type locality for genus
 †Uluops uluops – type locality for species
 Unio
 Vanikoro
 †Viburnum
 Vitis
 Viviparus – or unidentified comparable form
 †Weichselia
 †Williamsonia – tentative report
 †Woodwardia
 †Xenocephalites
 †Xiphactinus
 Yoldia
  †Zamites
 †Zamites arcticus
 †Zamites borealis
 †Zamites brevipennis
 †Zapsalis – or unidentified comparable form
 †Zephyrosaurus – or unidentified comparable form
 †Zofiabaatar – type locality for genus
 †Zofiabaatar pulcher – type locality for species

Cenozoic

Selected Cenozoic taxa of Wyoming
 †Abuta – or unidentified related form
 †Acacia
 Accipiter
 †Accipiter gentilis
  †Accipiter striatus
 Acer
 †Acidomomys – type locality for genus
 †Acrostichum
 †Adilophontes – type locality for genus
 †Adocus
 Aegialia
 Aegolius
 †Aegolius acadicus
 †Aegolius funereus
  †Aepycamelus
 †Aesculus
 †Afairiguana – type locality for genus
 †Afairiguana avius – type locality for species
 Agelaius
 †Agelaius phoeniceus
 †Agnotocastor
 †Agnotocastor galushai – type locality for species
  †Agriochoerus
 †Ailanthus
 †Alastor
 Alces
 †Alces alces
 †Alchornea – or unidentified related form
 †Aletodon
  †Aletomeryx
 Aleurites
 †Allognathosuchus
 †Allophylus
 Alnus
  †Amentotaxus
 Amia
 †Amitabha – type locality for genus
 †Amitabha urbsinterdictensis – type locality for species
 †Ampelopsis
 †Amphechinus
 Amphiuma
 Amyda
 †Anamirta – or unidentified comparable form
 Anas
 †Anas acuta
  †Anas clypeata
 †Anas crecca
 †Anas platyrhynchos
 †Anconodon
 †Anemia
 †Anniealexandria – type locality for genus
 †Anobium
 †Anolbanolis – type locality for genus
 †Anolbanolis banalis – type locality for species
 †Anolbanolis geminus – type locality for species
 †Anosteira
 †Antherophagus
 Anthonomus
  Antilocapra
 †Antilocapra americana
 Apalone
  †Aphelops
 Aquila
 †Aquila chrysaetos
 Aralia
 Araneus
 †Araucaria
 †Archaeocyon
 †Archaeotherium
 †Archaerhineura – type locality for genus
 †Arctocyon
  †Arctodus
 †Arctodus simus
 †Arctostaphylos
 †Arenahippus
 †Aristolochia
 †Armintomys
 †Armintomys tullbergi
 †Artocarpus – tentative report
 †Asarkina
 Asio
 †Asio flammeus
  †Asio otus
 †Asplenium
 †Astronium
 †Athyana
 †Avunculus
 Aythya
 †Aythya collaris
 Azolla
 †Babibasiliscus – type locality for genus
 †Baena
 †Bahndwivici – type locality for genus
 †Bahndwivici ammoskius – type locality for species
 †Baiotomeus
 †Baiotomeus douglassi
 †Baiotomeus lamberti
  †Barylambda
 †Bathornis
 †Bathygenys
  †Bathyopsis
 †Batodonoides
 †Batodonoides vanhouteni – type locality for species
 †Batrachosauroides – tentative report
 Bauhinia
 †Beilschmiedia
 †Berosus
 Betula
 Biomphalaria
 Bison
  †Bison bison
 †Bisonalveus – type locality for genus
 †Bisonalveus browni – type locality for species
 †Blechnum
 Bledius
  †Boavus – type locality for genus
 Boletina
 †Bootherium
 †Bootherium bombifrons
 †Borealosuchus
 †Borealosuchus formidabilis
 †Borealosuchus wilsoni – type locality for species
  †Boverisuchus
 †Boverisuchus vorax
  †Brachycrus
 †Brachyhyops
 †Brachyrhynchocyon
 †Brachyuranochampsa – type locality for genus
 †Brachyuranochampsa eversolei – type locality for species
 Bracon
 Branta
 †Branta canadensis
 †Brontops
 †Bryophyte – or unidentified related form
 Bubo
 †Bubo virginianus
 Buteo
  †Buteo jamaicensis
 †Buteo lagopus
 †Buteo regalis – or unidentified comparable form
 Buteogallus
 †Caedocyon
 †Caedocyon tedfordi – type locality for species
 †Caenopus
 †Caesalpinia
 †Calamospiza
 †Calamospiza melanocorys
 Calidris
 †Calidris melanotos
 †Callomyia
  †Camelops
 †Camelops hesternus – or unidentified comparable form
 †Canarium
 †Canavalia
 Canis
  †Canis dirus
 †Canis latrans
 †Canis lupus
 †Cantius
 †Cantius abditus – type locality for species
 †Cantius frugivorus
 †Cantius mckennai
 †Cantius ralstoni
 †Cantius torresi
 †Cantius trigonodus – type locality for species
 Capella
 †Capella gallinago
 Caracara
  †Caracara plancus
 †Cardiospermum
 Carduelis
 †Carpolestes
  †Carpolestes simpsoni – type locality for species
 Carya
 Castanea
 Castor
 †Catopsalis
 †Catopsalis alexanderi
 †Catopsalis calgariensis
 Cedrela
 †Cedrobaena – type locality for genus
  †Celastrus
 Celtis
 †Centrocercus
 †Centrocercus urophasianus
 †Cephalogale
 †Ceratophyllum
 †Ceratophyllum muricatum
  †Ceratosuchus
 †Ceratosuchus burdoshi
 Cercidiphyllum
 †Cercopis
  †Champsosaurus
 Chara
 Charadrius
 †Charadrius montanus
 †Charadrius vociferus
 Charina
 Cheilosia
 †Chelomophrynus – type locality for genus
 †Chilostigma – tentative report
 Chironomus
  †Chisternon
 †Cholula
 †Choragus
 †Chordeiles
 †Chordeiles minor
 †Chriacus
 †Chriacus oconostotae
 †Cimolestes
  Cinnamomum
 Circus
 †Circus cyaneus
 Cissus
 †Cixius – tentative report
  Cladrastis
 †Cnemidaria
 †Coccothraustes
 †Coccothraustes vespertinus
 Cocculus
 Colaptes
 †Colaptes auratus
 †Colodon
 †Compsemys
  †Coniophis
 †Copecion
 †Copelemur
 †Corizus – tentative report
  †Cormocyon
 Cornus
 Corvus
 †Corvus brachyrhynchos
 †Corvus corax
 †Corylus
  †Coryphodon
 Crataegus
 †Credneria
 Crocodylus
  †Crocodylus affinis – type locality for species
 †Cryptocephalus
 Cryptorhynchus
 Cryptotis
 Culex
 Cyclocarya
 †Cynarctoides
 †Cynarctoides acridens
 †Cynarctoides harlowi
 †Cynarctoides luskensis – type locality for species
 †Dalbergia
 †Daphoenictis
  †Daphoenodon
 †Daphoenus
 †Daphoenus lambei
 Dasyatis
 †Davidia
 †Dawsonicyon – type locality for genus
 Dendragapus
 †Dendragapus obscurus
 †Dendropanax
 †Dennstaedtia
 †Desmatippus
 †Desmatochoerus
 †Desmocyon
 †Diacodexis
 †Diatryma – type locality for genus
  †Diceratherium
 Dicranomyia
 Dicrostonyx
 †Didymictis
 †Dilophodon
  †Dinictis
 †Dinohyus
 †Diospyros
 †Diplocynodon
  †Diplomystus
 †Diplomystus dentatus
 †Dipoides
 Dipteronia
 Discus
 †Dissacus
 †Distylium
 Dolichopus
 †Dombeya
 †Domnina
 †Drimys
 Dryopteris
  †Echmatemys
 †Ectocion
 †Ectoconus
 †Ectopistes
 †Ectopistes migratorius
 †Ectopocynus
 †Elaeodendron
 †Enhydrocyon
 †Enhydrocyon basilatus
 Enochrus
  †Entelodon
  †Eobasileus
 †Eobasileus cornutus
 †Eoconodon
 †Eoconodon copanus
 †Eohippus
 †Eorhinophrynus
 †Eostrix
 †Eotitanops
 †Epicaerus
  †Epihippus
 †Equisetum
 Equus
  †Equus conversidens
 Eremophila
 †Eremophila alpestris
 Erythrina
 Esox
 †Eucastor
 †Eucommia
 Eugenia
 †Euparius
 Euphagus
 †Euphagus cyanocephalus
  †Eusmilus
 Eutamias
 Fagus
 Falco
 †Falco columbarius
  †Falco mexicanus
 †Falco rusticolus
 †Falco sparverius
 Ficus
  †Fluvioviridavis – type locality for genus
 †Fortuna
 †Fraxinus
 †Fulgora
 †Gagadon
 †Gagadon minimonstrum
 †Galecyon
 Galerita
 †Gallinuloides – type locality for genus
 Gastrocopta
 Gerrhonotus – or unidentified comparable form
 Ginkgo
  †Ginkgo adiantoides
 †Gleditsia – or unidentified related form
  Glyptostrobus
 †Glyptostrobus europaeus
 †Goniacodon
 Gopherus
 †Gracilocyon
 Grus
 †Grus canadensis
 Gulo
 †Gulo gulo
 †Gymnocladus
 Gyraulus – or unidentified comparable form
 †Habrosaurus
 †Habrosaurus dilatus
 †Hadrianus
  †Hapalodectes
 †Hapalorestes
 †Haplolambda
 †Harpagolestes
 †Helaletes – type locality for genus
 †Helix
  †Helodermoides
 †Helodermoides tuberculatus
 †Hemiauchenia
 Hemitelia
  †Heptodon
 †Herpetotherium
 †Herpetotherium knighti
 †Hesperocyon
 †Heteraletes
 Hirundo – or unidentified comparable form
 †Hirundo pyrrhonota
 †Holospira
 †Homogalax
  †Hoplophoneus
 †Hovenia
 †Hutchemys
  †Hyaenodon
 †Hyaenodon crucians
 †Hyaenodon horridus
 †Hyaenodon megaloides
 †Hyaenodon montanus
 †Hyaenodon mustelinus
 †Hyaenodon venturae
 †Hyaenodon vetus
 Hydrangea
 Hydrobia – report made of unidentified related form or using admittedly obsolete nomenclature
 Hydrobius
 †Hydrochus
 †Hydromystria
 †Hylobius
 †Hyopsodus
 †Hyopsodus lepidus – type locality for species
 †Hypertragulus
 †Hypisodus
  †Hypohippus
 †Hypolagus
 †Hyporhina
 †Hypsiops
 †Hyrachyus
  †Hyracodon
 †Hyracotherium
 †Hyracotherium vasacciense
  †Icaronycteris – type locality for genus
 †Icaronycteris index – type locality for species
 †Indusia
 †Intyrictis
 †Ischyromys
 †Iulus
 Juglans
 †Juncitarsus – type locality for genus
 Junco – or unidentified comparable form
 †Junco hyemalis
 †Kalmia
 †Kalobatippus
  †Knightia
 †Knightia eocaena
 Koelreuteria
 †Lagopus
 †Lagopus leucurus – or unidentified comparable form
 †Lambdotherium
 †Lambertocyon
 †Lambertocyon eximius
 Lanius
 †Lanius ludovicianus
 Larus – or unidentified comparable form
 Lathrobium
 †Laurinoxylon
 Laurus
 Leiocephalus
 Lepisosteus
  †Leptauchenia
 †Leptictis
 †Leptocyon
 †Leptolambda
  †Leptomeryx
 †Leptoreodon
 †Leptotragulus
 Lepus
 †Leucosticte
 †Leucosticte arctoa
  †Limnocyon
 †Limnocyon verus – type locality for species
 †Limnofregata – type locality for genus
 †Limnofregata azygosternon – type locality for species
 Lindera
 †Lisserpeton
 †Lisserpeton bairdi
 †Listronotus
 †Lithophysa – type locality for genus
  †Lithornis
 †Lithornis plebius – type locality for species
 †Lithornis promiscuus – type locality for species
 Lygodium
 Lynx
 †Lynx lynx – tentative report
 †Lystra – tentative report
 †Macginitiea
 †Machaeroides
 Macrocranion
 Magnolia
 †Maiorana
 †Mammacyon
 †Mammuthus
  †Mammuthus columbi
 Marmota
  †Megacerops
 †Megalictis
 †Megalictis ferox
 †Meliosma
 †Meniscotherium
 †Menoceras
 †Menops
 †Mentoclaenodon
 Mergus
 †Mergus merganser
  †Merychippus
 †Merychyus
 †Merycochoerus
 †Merycodus
 †Merycoides
 †Merycoidodon
 †Mesatirhinus
  †Mesocyon – report made of unidentified related form or using admittedly obsolete nomenclature
 †Mesodma
 †Mesodma formosa
 †Mesodma garfieldensis – or unidentified comparable form
 †Mesodma hensleighi
 †Mesodma pygmaea
 †Mesohippus
 †Mesonyx
 †Mesonyx obtusidens – type locality for species
 †Mesoreodon
  †Metacheiromys
 †Metamynodon
 †Metamynodon planifrons – or unidentified comparable form
 †Metarhinus
 Metasequoia
 †Metasequoia occidentalis
 †Metatomarctus
  †Miacis
 †Michenia
 †Microcosmodon
 †Microcosmodon conus – type locality for species
 †Microcosmodon rosei – type locality for species
 Microphysula – or unidentified comparable form
 †Microsyops
 Microtus
 †Microtus pennsylvanicus
 †Mimetodon
 †Mimetodon churchilli – type locality for species
  †Mimoperadectes
 †Mimoperadectes houdei – type locality for species
 †Miniochoerus
 †Miocyon
 †Miohippus
  †Mioplosus
 †Miotapirus
 †Miotapirus harrisonensis – type locality for species
 †Miotylopus
  †Miracinonyx
 †Miracinonyx studeri
 †Mithrandir
 Mnemosyne
 †Monosaulax
  †Moropus
 Morus
 Mustela
 †Mustela nigripes
 Myrica
 Myrmica
 †Nanotragulus
 †Neanis
 †Nelumbo
 †Neocathartes
 †Neocathartes grallator
 †Neoliotomus
 †Neoliotomus conventus
 †Neoliotomus ultimus
  Neophrontops
 †Neophrontops americanus
 †Neoplagiaulax
 †Neoplagiaulax grangeri – tentative report
 †Neoplagiaulax hunteri
 †Neoplagiaulax jepi – type locality for species
 †Neoplagiaulax mckennai – type locality for species
 †Neoplagiaulax nelsoni
 Neotoma
 †Nexuotapirus
 †Niglarodon
 †Notharctus
 †Notharctus robustior
  †Notharctus tenebrosus – type locality for species
 †Notharctus venticolus
  †Notogoneus
 †Nototamias – or unidentified comparable form
 †Nucifraga
 †Nucifraga columbiana
 Numenius
 †Numenius americanus
 †Numenius borealis
 †Nyctea
 †Nyctea scandiaca
 †Nyssa
 Ochotona
 †Ochotona princeps
 Ocotea
 †Odaxosaurus
 †Odaxosaurus piger
 Ondatra
 †Onoclea
  †Onychonycteris – type locality for genus
 †Onychonycteris finneyi – type locality for species
 †Oodectes
 Ophryastes
 †Opisthotriton
  Oreamnos
 †Oreodontoides
 Oreohelix
 †Oreopanax
 †Ormiscus
  †Orohippus
 †Orthogenysuchus – type locality for genus
 †Orthogenysuchus olseni – type locality for species
 †Osbornodon
 †Osmanthus
 †Osmunda
 †Otarocyon
 †Otiorhynchus
 †Ototriton – type locality for genus
 †Ototriton solidus – type locality for species
 Ovis
  †Ovis canadensis
 †Oxyacodon
 †Oxyaena
  †Oxydactylus
 †Pachyaena
 Pachycondyla
 †Palaearctonyx
 †Palaeogale
 †Palaeolagus
 †Palaeonictis
 †Palaeoryctes
 †Palaeosinopa
  †Palaeosyops
 †Palatobaena – type locality for genus
 †Paleoamphiuma – type locality for genus
 Paliurus
 Panthera
  †Panthera leo
 †Pantolambda
 †Paracathartes
 †Paracathartes howardae
 †Paracynarctus
 †Paraenhydrocyon
 †Paraenhydrocyon josephi
  †Parahippus
 †Paramys
 †Parandrita
 †Paratomarctus
 †Paratylopus
 †Parectypodus
 †Parectypodus lunatus
 †Parectypodus sinclairi
 †Parectypodus sylviae
 †Parictis
 †Parvitragulus
  †Patriofelis
 †Patriofelis ferox – type locality for species
 †Patriomanis
  †Peltosaurus
 †Pelycodus
 †Pentacosmodon
 †Pentacosmodon pronus – type locality for species
 †Peratherium
 Perognathus
 Peromyscus
 Persea
 †Phalaenoptilus
 †Phalaenoptilus nuttallii
  †Phareodus
 †Phareodus encaustus
 †Phareodus testis
 †Phenacocoelus
 †Phenacodontid
  †Phenacodus
 Phenacomys
 †Philodendron – or unidentified related form
 †Philotrox
 †Philotrox condoni
  †Phlaocyon
 †Phlaocyon annectens
 †Phlaocyon minor
 †Phoebe
 Phragmites – tentative report
 Phyllobius
 Physa
 Pica
 †Pica pica
 †Piceoerpeton – type locality for genus
 Pinus
 Pipilo
 †Pipilo chlorurus
 †Plagiomene
 †Planera
 †Planetetherium
 †Planetetherium mirabile
 †Plastomenoides
 Platanus
 Platycarya
 Platynus
 Plecia
  †Plesiadapis
 †Plesiadapis cookei
 †Poabromylus
 †Poebrodon
 †Poebrotherium
 Polygyra
 Populus
 Porzana
 †Porzana carolina
 †Potamogeton
  †Presbyornis
 †Primobucco
 †Princetonia
 †Priscacara
 †Pristichampsus
 †Probathyopsis
 †Procaimanoidea
  †Procamelus
 †Prochetodon
 †Prochetodon cavus – type locality for species
 †Prochetodon foxi
 †Prochetodon taxus – type locality for species
 †Procynodictis
 †Prolimnocyon
 †Promartes
 †Promerycochoerus
 †Proscalops
  †Protoceras
 †Protochelydra
 †Protochelydra zangerli – or unidentified comparable form
 †Protohippus
 †Protolabis
 †Protomarctus
 †Protorohippus
 †Protostrix
 †Protungulatum
  †Protungulatum donnae
 †Protylopus
 Prunus
 †Pseudaelurus
 †Pseudhipparion
  †Pseudocrypturus – type locality for genus
 †Pseudocrypturus cercanaxius – type locality for species
 †Pseudolabis
 †Pseudoprotoceras
 †Psilota
 †Psittacotherium
 Ptelea
 Pteris – or unidentified related form
 Pterocarya
  †Ptilodus
 †Ptilodus fractus
 †Ptilodus gnomus
 †Ptilodus kummae
 †Ptilodus mediaevus
 †Ptilodus montanus – or unidentified comparable form
 †Ptilodus tsosiensis – or unidentified comparable form
 †Ptilodus wyomingensis – type locality for species
 Puma
 †Puma concolor
 Pupilla – or unidentified comparable form
 †Pyramidula
 †Pyrocyon
 Quercus
 Quiscalus – or unidentified comparable form
  †Ramoceros
 †Raphictis
 †Rhamnus
  Rhineura – type locality for genus
 Rhinoclemmys – report made of unidentified related form or using admittedly obsolete nomenclature
 Rhus
 †Rhyssa
 †Robinia
 Rosa
 Sabal
 †Saccoloma
 Salix
 †Salpinctes – or unidentified comparable form
 †Salpinctes obsoletus
 †Salvinia
  †Saniwa – type locality for genus
 †Saniwa ensidens – type locality for species
 †Sapindus
  Sassafras
 †Scapherpeton
 †Schoepfia
 Sciara
 †Sciophila
 Sequoia
 †Sespia
 †Shoshonius
 †Shoshonius bowni
 †Shoshonius cooperi
 †Sialia
 †Sifrhippus
 †Simoedosaurus
 †Sinomenium – or unidentified related form
  †Sinopa
 Siren
 †Siren dunni – type locality for species
 Sitona
 Sloanea – or unidentified related form
 †Smilax
 †Smilodectes
 †Smilodectes gracilis – type locality for species
 †Smilodectes mcgrewi – type locality for species
 Sorex
 †Sorex hoyi
 †Sparganium
 †Spathorhynchus – type locality for genus
 †Spathorhynchus fossorium – type locality for species
 †Spathorhynchus natronicus
  Spermophilus
 †Spermophilus variegatus
  †Sphenocoelus
 Spirodela
 †Spiza
 †Spiza americana
 Stagnicola
 †Stegobium
  †Steneofiber
  †Stenomylus
 †Stenomylus gracilis
 †Stenomylus hitchcocki
 †Stenomylus keelinensis
 Sterculia
 †Stillingia
 Sturnella
 †Sturnella neglecta
 †Stygimys
 †Stygimys kuszmauli
 †Stylemys
  †Stylinodon
 †Styrax
  †Subhyracodon
 Surnia
 †Surnia ulula
 †Suzanniwana – type locality for genus
 †Suzanniwana patriciana – type locality for species
 †Suzanniwana revenanta – type locality for species
 †Swartzia
 Sylvilagus
 Symplocos
 Synaptomys
  †Syndyoceras
 †Syndyoceras cooki
 Syrphus
 Tachycineta – or unidentified comparable form
 †Tachycineta bicolor
  †Taeniolabis
 †Taeniolabis taoensis
 Tamias
 †Tanymykter
 †Tapocyon
 †Tarka
 Taxidea
 †Taxidea taxus
 Taxodium
 †Taxonus
 †Teilhardina
  †Teleoceras
 †Telmatherium
 †Temnocyon
 †Tetraclaenodon
 Thelypteris
 †Thouinia
 †Thuja
 Tilia
 Tipula
  †Titanoides
 †Titanoides gidleyi – type locality for species
 †Titanoides major
 †Titanoides nanus – type locality for species
 †Titanoides primaevus
  †Titanomyrma
 †Titanomyrma lubei – type locality for species
 †Trapa
 †Trigenicus
 †Trigonias
 Trionyx
 †Tritemnodon
 †Tritoma
 †Triumfetta
  †Trogosus
 †Tropisternus
 †Trypodendron
 †Tsoabichi – type locality for genus
 †Tsoabichi greenriverensis – type locality for species
 Turdus – or unidentified comparable form
 †Turdus migratorius
 †Tylocephalonyx
 Tympanuchus
 †Tympanuchus phasianellus
 Typha – or unidentified related form
 †Tytthaena
 †Uintacyon
  †Uintatherium – type locality for genus
 †Uintatherium anceps – type locality for species
 Ulmus
 Unio
 Ursus
  †Ursus arctos
 †Ustatochoerus
 †Valenia
 †Valenopsalis
 †Vassacyon
 †Vauquelinia
  †Viburnum
 †Vinea – or unidentified comparable form
 Vitis
 †Viverravus
 Viviparus
  †Vulpavus
 Vulpes
 †Vulpes vulpes
 †Woodwardia
 †Xanclomys
 †Xanclomys mcgrewi – type locality for species
 †Xyronomys
  †Ysengrinia
 †Zamia
 Zelkova
 Zenaida
 Zizyphus
 †Zodiolestes
 Zonotrichia
 †Zonotrichia albicollis

References
 

Wyoming